L'imboscata (Italian for "The ambush") is a studio album by Italian singer-songwriter Franco Battiato, released by Mercury Records in 1996. After some more experimental albums and meditative songs, the album marked the return of Battiato to a rock sound and to a massive commercial success, mainly pushed by the success of the single "La cura".

Track listing
 Di passaggio - 3:35 (lyrics: Franco Battiato, Manlio Sgalambro)
 Strani giorni - 3:57
 La cura - 4:01 (lyrics: Franco Battiato, Manlio Sgalambro)
 ... ein Tag aus dem Leben des kleinen Johannes - 3:47
 Amata solitudine - 4:04
 Splendide previsioni - 3:52
 Ecco com'è che va il mondo - 4:21
 Segunda feira - 3:59
 Memorie di Giulia - 3:16
 Serial killer - 4:06

Music by Franco Battiato. Lyrics by Manlio Sgalambro except when noted.

References

1996 albums
Franco Battiato albums
Italian-language albums